Log Kya Kahenge is a Pakistani television series premiered on 25 July 2020 on ARY Digital replacing Jhooti. It is produced by Abdullah Seja under their banner Idream Entertainment. It stars Faysal Qureshi and Saheefa Jabbar Khattak. The supporting cast include Aijaz Aslam, Sakina Samo and Kinza Razzak among others.

Cast 
Faysal Qureshi as Saad
Aijaz Aslam as Haseeb (Dead)
Saheefa Jabbar Khattak as Meerab
Sakina Samo as Haseeb's mother 
Humaira Zaheer as Aabi
Kinza Razzak as Kiran; Saad's wife
Furqan Qureshi as Haroon
Afshan Qureshi as Haroon's mother
Anoosheh Rania Khan as Dania
Tipu Sharif as Tariq; Meerab's brother
Aslam Shahed
Zuhab Khan as Rahim (Older)

Reception

Ratings

After 5 Episodes Ratings start falling and beaten by HumTV's Mushk due to this channel changed its slot and ratings increased slowly.

Awards and nominations

Soundtrack

The title song is sung by Ali Tariq. The music was composed by Ahsan Ali Taj and the lyrics were also written by Ahsan Ali Taj.

References 

Pakistani drama television series
2020 Pakistani television series debuts
Pakistani television series
Urdu-language television shows